Hartmut Piniek (born in 1950 in Wolgast) is a German painter.

Life 
After learning the trade of a painter, Piniek worked as a shipyard welder, theatre set painter and as a graphic artist in the medical and scientific area. From 1979 to 1984, he studied painting and graphic arts with Volker Stelzmann, Dietrich Burger and Arno Rink at the Academy of Visual Arts Leipzig (Hochschule für Grafik und Buchkunst). Afterwards Piniek was a master-class student with Bernhard Heisig from 1984 to 1987 and subsequently became an assistant and lecturer of painting at the Hochschule für Grafik und Buchkunst Leipzig from 1987 to 1998.

Work 
In his work Piniek focuses on spacious atmospherical landscapes from an aerial perspective filled with artefacts of civilization, small, hazy objects and single, minimised figures.

Collections 
Kupferstichkabinett, Dresden 
Museum der bildenden Künste Leipzig 
Lindenau-Museum Altenburg
Deutsche Bank, Frankfurt am Main 
Sparkasse Leipzig|Kunsthalle der Sparkasse Leipzig
Sorbisches Museum Bautzen
Neue Sächsische Galerie in Chemnitz
Kunsthalle Bremen
Deutsches Buch- und Schriftmuseum der Deutschen Bücherei Leipzig
Stadtgeschichtliches Museum Leipzig
Schloss Meiningen
Burg Beeskow|Kunstarchiv Beeskow

References 
Angela Krauß: Hartmut Piniek, zur Ausstellung Leibniz-Klub, Leipzig 1986
Peter Guth: Über den Dächern von Leipzig. Malerei und Grafik von Hartmut Piniek, ausgestellt in der Galerie des Leibniz-Klub, Sächsisches Tageblatt, 8. April 1986
Peter K. Kirchhof: Archäologie in einer vergessenen verlorenen Landschaft. Hartmut Piniek – Ein Spurensucher in der Leere, die horen 39. Jg. (1994) H. 175, S. 67–88
Peter Guth: o.T., Frankfurter Allgemeine Zeitung, 23. März 1996
Dr. Hans Zitko: Landschaften der bedrohten Existenz. Zu den Bildern von Hartmut Piniek, In: Hartmut Piniek. Katalog, Graphikangebot Müller, Leipzig 1996
Dr. Hans Zitko: Hartmut Piniek. Der Kunsthandel 89 (1997) 2, S. 34–35
Tim Sommer: Hartmut Piniek, In: Hartmut Piniek . Übersichtskatalog 1974–2000, Leipzig 2000  
Simone Tippach-Schneider (Hg.): Hartmut Piniek – Familie unterwegs, In: Bilderbühnen – Leinwandszenen aus dem Kunstarchiv Beeskow 1978 bis 1988, S. 46–47; Beeskow 2010

External links 
Literature on Hartmut Piniek in the catalogue of the German National Library
Information on Hartmut Piniek in the BAM-Portal
Artist’s website

1950 births
20th-century German painters
20th-century German male artists
German male painters
21st-century German painters
21st-century German male artists
Living people
Hochschule für Grafik und Buchkunst Leipzig alumni
People from Wolgast
Artists from Mecklenburg-Western Pomerania